Wirangu may be,

Wirangu people
Wirangu language